Unitus Seed Fund (now Unitus Ventures) is a venture fund based in Bangalore and Seattle that supports early-stage tech startups with India scale and global potential. It funds early-stage Indian technology startups, primarily in the healthcare, education and financial sectors.  As an impact investment fund, its focus is on startups that serve low and middle-income consumers.

History
Unitus Seed Fund (now Unitus Ventures) was started in 2012 by Unitus Group, a financial services group founded in 2000 with the goal of making money while reducing global poverty. In the summer of 2012, Unitus Seed Fund spun out of Unitus Group as a separate venture investment management company and fund in order to scale-up investing operations.   Its first fund was US$23 million and in 2016 it started raising a second fund with a target of US$50 million.   Its early investors included Bill Gates, Vinod Khosla, and the Michael and Susan Dell Foundation.

References

External links
 

Venture capital firms of India
Social finance
Indian companies established in 2012
Companies based in Bangalore
Financial services companies established in 2012
American companies established in 2012
Companies based in Seattle
2012 establishments in Karnataka